Young Sheldon is an American coming-of-age sitcom television series created by Chuck Lorre and Steven Molaro for CBS. The series, set in the late 1980s and early 1990s, is a spin-off prequel to The Big Bang Theory and begins with the character Sheldon Cooper at the age of nine, living with his family in East Texas and going to high school. Iain Armitage stars as young Sheldon, alongside Zoe Perry, Lance Barber, Montana Jordan, Raegan Revord, and Annie Potts. Jim Parsons, who portrays the adult Sheldon Cooper on The Big Bang Theory, narrates the series and is also an executive producer.

Development of the prequel series began in November 2016, from an initial idea that Parsons passed along to The Big Bang Theory producers. The following March, Armitage and Perry were cast, and the series was ordered by CBS. Young Sheldon premiered as a special preview on September 25, 2017, and was picked up for a full season that began airing weekly from November 2, 2017. In March 2021, CBS renewed the series through to a seventh season. The sixth season premiered on September 29, 2022.

Premise
The series takes place in the late 1980s and early 1990s and follows Sheldon Cooper attending high school in the fictional town of Medford, Texas. As a nine-year-old boy (in the first season) attending high school, he tries to fit into a world full of more socially normal people, including his own family and friends, who do not quite understand how to deal with his unique intellectual capabilities and social ineptitude. At age 11, Sheldon graduates high school and begins attending the fictional university East Texas Tech full time.

In the series premiere, adult Sheldon states "nobody I knew in East Texas in 1989 cared about Newtonian physics". Several other episodes make spoken or written references to, or reference historic or pop cultural events from the early 1990s.

Cast and characters

Main
 Iain Armitage as Sheldon Lee Cooper, a child prodigy well-versed in various branches of mathematics and science. He states that he decided to pursue physics around the same time as the show began. While academically gifted, Sheldon sometimes lacks a full understanding of social cues, in addition to having a sense of superiority over everyone around him. Nevertheless, Sheldon has proven to love his family and almost always has his heart in the right place. He is Georgie's younger brother and Missy’s fraternal older twin brother. He is age 9 in the first season and age 13 by the sixth.
 Jim Parsons is the voice of adult Sheldon Cooper, who provides the perspective of an adult recalling his childhood.

 Zoe Perry as Mary Cooper (née Tucker), mother of Sheldon, Missy, and Georgie. She is very protective and patient with Sheldon, but also struggles to understand him at times. She is a devout Southern Baptist, working at her local church, and sometimes objects to Sheldon's atheism. Nevertheless, she deeply loves her son and wants to protect him for as long as she can. Perry's mother, Laurie Metcalf, played Mary on The Big Bang Theory.
George does not share Sheldon's intellect, which sometimes leads others, especially Meemaw, to doubt his genetic relationship to Sheldon. He is often at odds with his children and particularly struggles to understand Sheldon, but he does try to be a caring and responsible father. In The Big Bang Theory, it is stated that George Cooper Sr. will die when Sheldon is 14 years old in 1995. Barber appeared in a Season 5 episode of The Big Bang Theory as one of Leonard's high school bullies, Jimmy Speckerman, before making an appearance via a 1990s videotape as his Young Sheldon character in a final season episode.
 Montana Jordan as George  Marshall "Georgie" Cooper Jr., Sheldon and Missy's older brother. Georgie resents the attention his parents pay to Sheldon. He does not do well at school and gets mocked and teased for it by the rest of the family, particularly Sheldon and Meemaw. He does not get along with his brother Sheldon because he's tired of always being compared to his brother. He attends Medford High with Sheldon and plays on the school's football team. At age 17, he drops out of school to work full-time and discovers a talent for sales that will lead him to become the wealthy owner of a tire store chain in The Big Bang Theory, on which he is played by Jerry O'Connell.
 Raegan Revord as Melissa "Missy" Cooper, Georgie's younger sister and Sheldon's younger twin sister. She teases Sheldon along with Georgie but not as much. She does not share Sheldon's intelligence, but is very perceptive. Occasionally, she does not get along with Sheldon, but she finds in her twin brother a solid confidant and has admitted to not feeling as whole without him. She also shows love for her brother even though she constantly denies it. Courtney Henggeler plays adult Missy in The Big Bang Theory.

 Annie Potts as Constance "Connie" Tucker, Sheldon, Missy, and Georgie's maternal grandmother, whom they refer to as "Meemaw". She is a fun-loving woman who can be sarcastic and often mocks those around her, especially George. On the other hand, she is patient with Sheldon and sometimes struggles to understand him, whom she affectionately calls 'Moonpie', and advises Mary to trust that Sheldon will find his way. In the fourth season, she was said to be 68 years old. June Squibb plays old Constance in The Big Bang Theory.
 Matt Hobby as Pastor Jeff Difford (season 3–present; recurring seasons 1–2), the upbeat pastor at the Cooper family's Baptist church. Like Mary, he too sometimes has friction with Sheldon's irreligious side and often challenges Sheldon to explore their line of thought through logic exercises. 
 Wyatt McClure as Billy Sparks (season 5–present; recurring seasons 1–4), the son of Herschel and Brenda, whom his mother implies is in no danger of going to college. He was originally portrayed as Sheldon's nemesis, but becomes much friendlier early in the series. He has an unrequited crush on Missy.
 Emily Osment as Mandy McAllister (season 6; recurring season 5), Georgie's 29-year-old girlfriend, with whom he has a child.

Recurring
 Wallace Shawn as John Sturgis (season 1–present), a college physics professor whose class Sheldon attends as his first college course. He dates Meemaw with Sheldon's encouragement in seasons 1 through 3. He also works for a grocery store from later season 4 to early season 5 after being fired from working on a hadron super collider, before getting fired again.
 Ryan Phuong as Tam Nguyen (season 1–4), Sheldon's Vietnamese-American childhood best friend and classmate. Tam is responsible for introducing Sheldon to many of his non-scientific interests, including comic books and role-playing games. Tam is Sheldon's only friend who consistently puts up with him. Robert Wu plays adult Tam on The Big Bang Theory.
 Billy Gardell as Herschel Sparks (seasons 1–2), Billy's father and Brenda's husband, who owns a garage and divorces his wife in season 4
 Melissa Peterman as Brenda Sparks (season 1–present), Billy's mother, Herschel's wife until season 4, and Mary's initial nemesis and eventual friend, who works at the bowling alley frequented by Meemaw
 Doc Farrow as Assistant Coach Wayne Wilkins (season 1–present), Sheldon's P.E. teacher and the former assistant, now head football coach at Medford High. He was originally given the name Roy, but it was changed to Wayne as of the episode "A Broom Closet and Satan's Monopoly Board".
 Valerie Mahaffey as Victoria MacElroy (seasons 1–3), Sheldon's homeroom and English teacher at Medford High
 Danielle Pinnock as Evelyn Ingram (seasons 1–4), Sheldon's math teacher at Medford High.
 Brian Stepanek as Hubert Givens (season 1–present), Sheldon's science teacher at Medford High
 Rex Linn as Tom Petersen (season 1–present), the principal of Medford High
 Sarah Baker as Sheryl Hutchins (season 1–present), the Medford High librarian
 Jason Alexander as Gene Lundy (season 1–present), Medford High School's resident drama teacher
 Nancy Linehan Charles as Peg (season 1–present), Pastor Jeff's chain-smoking secretary
 Chris Wylde as Glenn (seasons 1–3), the owner of the comic book store King Kong Comics
 Isabel May as Veronica Duncan (seasons 2–3), Georgie's Halloween date who is introduced in "Seven Deadly Sins and a Small Carl Sagan". She becomes a Christian after witnessing the "lust" room in Mr. Lundy's haunted house and loses interest in Georgie, who continues trying to win her over. She starts liking Georgie but backs off after he starts dating Jana.
 Ed Begley Jr. as Dr. Grant Linkletter (season 2–present), a colleague of Dr. Sturgis. He regularly pursues Connie but is continually rebuffed.
 Mckenna Grace as Paige Swanson (season 2–present), a child prodigy whom Sheldon views as his rival.
 Andrea Anders as Linda Swanson (seasons 2–4), Paige's mother
 Mary Grill as Officer Robin (seasons 2–3), Pastor Jeff's second wife who works as a police officer
 Craig T. Nelson as Dale Ballard (season 3–present), Missy's baseball coach and Meemaw's new boyfriend after Dr. Sturgis breaks up with her; he owns a sporting goods store and hires Georgie and George to work there.
 Reba McEntire as June (season 3–present), Dale's ex-wife, the local hairdresser whom Meemaw befriends.
 Ava Allan as Jana Boggs (season 3–5), Georgie's girlfriend after he gives up pursuing Veronica, but she breaks up with him in season 5 since she is upset that he decided to drop out of school
 London Cheshire as Marcus Larson (seasons 3–4), Missy's boyfriend
 Wendie Malick as President Linda Hagemeyer (season 4–present), the president of Sheldon's university
 Dan Byrd as Pastor Rob (season 5), a young, unorthodox pastor hired by Pastor Jeff to teach Sunday school. He and Mary appear to become mutually interested in one another during the fifth season, which upsets George.
 Caleb Emery as Darren (season 5), one of Sheldon's new college dorm room neighbors
 Ivan Mok as Oscar (season 5), one of Sheldon's new college dorm room neighbors
 Rachel Bay Jones as Audrey McAllister (season 6), Mandy's mother
 Will Sasso as Jim McAllister (season 6), Mandy's father

Guest
 Melissa Tang as Ms. Fenley, a music teacher at Sheldon's high school. Tang had previously played the character Mandy Chao in an episode of The Big Bang Theory.
 Vernee Watson as Nurse Althea Robinson, a nurse who caters to George when he suffers a mild heart attack and then to Sheldon when he has his gall bladder removed. Watson also plays a nurse named Althea in numerous episodes of The Big Bang Theory, including its pilot.
 John Hartman as Dr. Goetsch, the psychiatrist Sheldon sees when he has Phagophobia and when he loses at the Medford High science fair. 
 Ray Liotta as Vincent, Meemaw's bookie.
 Jason Kravits as Dr. Ronald Hodges, a NASA engineer and college roommate of Mr. Givens. He makes a presentation about his work to Mr. Givens' science class, which intrigues Sheldon to solve the challenges of reusable launch systems.
 Elon Musk makes a cameo appearance in the episode "A Patch, a Modem, and a Zantac®" in a flashforward scene set 27 years into the future.
 Dave Florek as Dr. Eberland, Sheldon's doctor.
 Karly Rothenberg as Mrs. Janice Veazey, Dr. Hodges' secretary.
 Frances Conroy as Dr. Flora Douglas, headmaster of the boarding school Sheldon briefly attends.
 Harry Groener as Elliot Douglas, Dr. Douglas' husband.
 Paul Yen as Le Nguyen, Tam's father. He runs Medford Mart with his wife.
 VyVy Nguyen as Trang Nguyen, Tam's mother and Mr. Nguyen's wife.
 Phil Morris as the voice of One and Anjali Bhimani as the voice of Zero in a dream Sheldon has.
 Richard Kind as Ira Rosenbloom, one of Meemaw's boyfriends.
 Zuleyka Silver as Selena, Pastor Jeff's ex-wife
 Anjelika Washington as Libby, an eleventh grade student who aspires to be a geologist and whom Sheldon and Tam befriend.
 Ella and Mia Allan as Bobbi Sparks, Billy Sparks' younger sister with a reputation for tormenting Sheldon.
 Cleo King as Mrs. Costello, a Medford High School counselor
 Michael Cudlitz as a NASA supervisor who appears in Sheldon's daydream sequence.
 Josh Cooke as Barry Swanson, Paige's father.
 Ella Anderson as Erica, Paige's sister, who bonds with Georgie and Missy because they share common experiences being siblings of child prodigies
 Paul Fusco appears as ALF in "A Race of Superhumans and a Letter to Alf" when he reads Missy's letter.
  Mauricio Lara as Ricky, Sheldon's hospital roommate in "A Tummy Ache and a Whale of a Metaphor"
 John Rubinstein as Rabbi Schneiderman
 Benjamin Stockham as Preston
 Maree Cheatham as Dorothy, Veronica's grandmother.
 Diedrich Bader as the voice of Batman in one of Sheldon's daydreams.
 Steve Burns as Nathan. Burns also is the performer of the show’s theme song. 
 Taylor Spreitler as Sam, a member of Sheldon's project group.
 Nolan Bateman as Keith, a member of Sheldon's project group.
 Louie Anderson as Ralph, the owner of a trophy shop where Mary wants to buy one for Missy.
 Ryan Stiles as Dr. Bowers, Sheldon's dentist.
 Melanie Lynskey as Professor Dora Ericson, Sheldon's college philosophy professor
 Dave Foley as Gary O'Brien, Sheldon's university benefactor
 David Hasselhoff as himself
 Julia Pace Mitchell as Darlene Wilkins, Coach Wilkins' wife
 Diane Ladd, Alan Rachins and Marla Gibbs as Hortense, Vern and Doris, Meemaw's friends.
 Bill Fagerbakke as Jake, a police officer and Dale Ballard's acquaintance.
 Lance Reddick as Professor Boucher, a former Army engineer and a professor of engineering at Sheldon’s university.
 Stephen Hawking as himself (voice-only).
 Ming-Na Wen as Dr. Carol Lee, a physicist from UC Berkeley brought in to lead a project that Sheldon, Dr. Sturgis, and Dr. Linkletter are working on.
 Penn Jillette and Teller as Pimple and Pus, Sheldon's imaginary personifications of his first pimple and its pus, who appear when he begins going through puberty.  Teller also appeared in multiple episodes of The Big Bang Theory as Larry Fowler, the father of Sheldon's future wife Amy.
Original cast cameos
 Mayim Bialik as Amy Farrah Fowler, Sheldon's wife and the mother of his son, Leonard Cooper, as well as at least one other child. This role is reprised from The Big Bang Theory. She appears as part of the narration.
 Kaley Cuoco as the voice of the pool water in one of Sheldon's nightmares. Cuoco previously played Penny in The Big Bang Theory.
 Simon Helberg as Howard Wolowitz, an aeronautical engineer and one of Sheldon’s adulthood friends. This role is reprised from The Big Bang Theory. He appears as part of the narration.
 Bob Newhart as Arthur Jeffries, a scientist who plays the title character of Professor Proton, Sheldon's favorite educational television series. The character is an homage to Mr. Wizard. Newhart reprises his portrayal of the character from The Big Bang Theory.

Episodes

Production

Development
In November 2016, it was reported that CBS was in negotiations to create a spin-off of The Big Bang Theory centered on Sheldon Cooper as a young boy. The prequel series, described as "a Malcolm in the Middle-esque single-camera family comedy" would be executive produced by The Big Bang Theory co-creator Chuck Lorre and producer Steven Molaro, with The Big Bang Theory co-creator Bill Prady expected to be involved in some capacity, and intended to air in the 2017–18 season alongside The Big Bang Theory. The initial idea for the series came from Jim Parsons (who portrays the adult Sheldon on The Big Bang Theory), who passed it along to The Big Bang Theory producers. On March 13, 2017, CBS ordered the spin-off Young Sheldon series, which was created by Lorre and Molaro. Jon Favreau directed and executive produced the pilot. Parsons, Lorre, Molaro and Todd Spiewak also serve as executive producers on the series, for Chuck Lorre Productions and Warner Bros. Television. On September 27, 2017, CBS picked up the series for a full season of 22 episodes. On January 6, 2018, the show was renewed for a second season, which premiered on September 24 of that same year.

On February 22, 2019, CBS renewed the series for both a third and a fourth season. The third season premiered on September 26, 2019. Warner Bros. Television suspended production on March 13, 2020, due to the COVID-19 pandemic, leaving the third season with only 21 episodes. Production for the fourth season began on September 22, 2020, but was paused on October 9, 2020, for one day, due to a positive COVID-19 test. The fourth season premiered on November 5, 2020.

Production for the fourth season concluded on March 15, 2021.

On March 30, 2021, CBS renewed the series for a fifth, sixth, and seventh season. The fifth season premiered on October 7, 2021. The sixth season premiered on September 29, 2022.

Casting
In early March 2017, Iain Armitage was cast as the younger Sheldon, and Zoe Perry as his mother, Mary Cooper. Perry is the real-life daughter of Laurie Metcalf, who portrays Mary Cooper on The Big Bang Theory. Lance Barber stars as George Cooper Sr., Sheldon's father; he had previously appeared in one episode of The Big Bang Theory. Raegan Revord stars as Missy Cooper, Sheldon's twin sister; Revord only got the part after repeatedly asking her mother to be allowed to read for the role. The show also stars Montana Jordan as George Cooper Jr., Sheldon's older brother. Jim Parsons reprises his role as adult Sheldon Cooper, as narrator for the series. In July 2017, Annie Potts was cast as Meemaw, Sheldon's grandmother.

Overlap with the parent series
In most cases different actors are used to portray a given character in the two series, to account for the age difference. Jim Parsons is a notable exception in that he appears in both series as the same character, though in this series his appearance is limited to voice only. In the Season 4 episode "Graduation", Mayim Bialik (as Amy, the wife of adult Sheldon) has a brief voice-over role while Sheldon describes the graduation party for their son Leonard, whom he reveals was named after Leonard Hofstadter and Leonard Nimoy. Bob Newhart appears as Professor Proton in both series; with the appearance in this series, the character is made to look younger. Iain Armitage (Sheldon), Lance Barber (George), and Montana Jordan (Georgie) make a guest appearance in the parent series in a scene in which a VHS tape recorded decades earlier is played. There are other actors who appear in both series but as different characters. This includes Barber, who had another guest appearance in the parent series as a different character, and Kaley Cuoco who stars in the parent series and makes an uncredited voice appearance in this series, voicing an inanimate object. Elon Musk makes cameo appearances as himself in both series.

The second-season finale episode aired immediately following the one-hour series finale of the parent series. In a tribute to the parent series finale, several references are made to it in the Young Sheldon episode. The references are both general to the entire parent series, as well as to the series finale in particular. In one scene in the Young Sheldon episode, Sheldon promises his father that when he wins the Nobel Prize, Sheldon will mention him in his acceptance speech. In the parent series finale, Sheldon wins the Nobel Prize, and he does mention his father (amongst others) in the acceptance speech. In another scene in the Young Sheldon episode, Nobel Prize winners are announced out over a montage showing the main characters from the parent series Leonard, Penny, Raj, Howard, Bernadette, and Amy as children. Christine Baranski and Carol Ann Susi, who respectively portray Leonard's mother and Howard's mother in the parent series, make a voice appearance in the montage (a posthumous appearance in the case of Susi). Following the montage, adult Sheldon says that he was wrong about feeling at the moment of the Nobel prize announcement that he would be all alone for the rest of his life.

Title sequence
The show's title sequence is played to the song "Mighty Little Man" by Steve Burns. The song is the first track in Burns' 2003 album Songs for Dustmites. The background in the first two series shows mountains and a desert, whilst the foreground has Sheldon (usually in bow tie, checked shirt, shorts and cowboy boots) walking out, standing triumphantly, before he notices a cow and backs away from it, before resuming his triumphant look as the logo appears and tilts to the sky. Occasionally, a tumbleweed appears, instead of the cow. The title sequence was changed from Season 3 onwards to include the entire Cooper family, as well as showing Sheldon in different costumes, such as Albert Einstein, Mr. Spock, The Flash, an astronaut, and a train engineer. Season 5 features a black bull in place of the cow.

Release

Broadcast
Young Sheldon began airing weekly episodes on CBS on November 2, 2017, after The Big Bang Theory. It premiered as a special preview on September 25, 2017.

Syndication 

Young Sheldon entered off-network syndication on Nick at Nite as of November 30, 2020.

In the United Kingdom, Young Sheldon is aired on the free-to-air channel E4, with season 1 premiered on February 22, 2018. Subsequent seasons premiered on November 8, 2018, and October 10, 2019, for seasons 2 and 3 respectively. Season 4 of Young Sheldon premiered on October 20, 2021, on E4 at 9 pm  Season 5 of Young Sheldon premiered on April 24, 2022 at 8pm on E4. On September 27, 2021, the series entered syndication in local markets, covering roughly 90% of the United States. The series also entered off-network syndication on TBS and began airing on September 27, 2021.

Streaming
In May 2020, it was announced that the first three seasons of the series would stream on the WarnerMedia's HBO Max service; no release date was announced at that time. The first three seasons were added on September 2, 2020. The fifth season debuted on September 7, 2022.

In October and November 2021, Netflix in Australia, Canada, and the United Kingdom picked up the streaming rights to the show.

Home media
The first season of Young Sheldon was released on DVD and Blu-ray by Warner Bros. on September 4, 2018. The second season was released on DVD and manufacture-on-demand Blu-ray on September 3, 2019. The third season was released on DVD and manufacture-on-demand Blu-ray on September 1, 2020 by Warner Bros. Home Entertainment and Warner Archive Collection respectively. The fourth season was released on DVD and Blu-ray on September 7, 2021. The fifth season was released on DVD and Blu-ray on September 6, 2022.

Reception

Ratings

Critical response
For the first season, the review aggregator website Rotten Tomatoes reported a 76% approval rating with an average rating of 6.6/10 based on 46 reviews. The website's consensus reads, "Young Sheldons appealing cast and relatable themes bring a freshand overall enjoyableperspective to its central character's familiar story." Metacritic, which uses a weighted average, assigned a score of 63 out of 100 based on 25 critics, indicating "generally favorable reviews".

Accolades 
The fourth season was one of 101 out of the 200 most-popular scripted television series that received the ReFrame Stamp for the years 2020 to 2021. The stamp is awarded by the gender equity coalition ReFrame and industry database IMDbPro for film and television projects that are proven to have gender-balanced hiring, with stamps being awarded to projects that hire female-identifying people, especially women of color, in four out of eight key roles for their production.

{| class="wikitable sortable plainrowheaders"
|+ 
! scope="col" | Award
! scope="col" | Date of ceremony
! scope="col" | Category
! scope="col" | Recipient(s)
! scope="col" | Result
! scope="col" class="unsortable" | 
|-
! scope="row" style="text-align:center;" | Artios Awards
| January 31, 2019
| Television Pilot & First Season — Comedy
| Nikki Valko, Ken Miller, and Peter Pappas
| 
| style="text-align:center;" | 
|-
! scope="row" rowspan="4" style="text-align:center;" | Critics' Choice Television Awards
| rowspan="2" | January 13, 2019
| rowspan="2" | Best Supporting Actress in a Comedy Series
| Zoe Perry
| 
| rowspan="2" style="text-align:center;" | 
|-
| Annie Potts
| 
|-
| March 13, 2022
| Best Actor in a Comedy Series
| Iain Armitage
| 
| style="text-align:center;" | 
|-
| January 15, 2023
| Best Supporting Actress in a Comedy Series
| Annie Potts
| 
| style="text-align:center;" | 
|-
! scope="row" style="text-align:center;" | Golden Reel Awards
| February 17, 2019
| Broadcast Media: Live Action Under 35:00
| "An 8-Bit Princess and a Flat Tire Genius"
| 
| style="text-align:center;" | 
|-
! scope="row" rowspan="2" style="text-align:center;" | Golden Trailer Awards
| May 29, 2019
| Best Comedy Poster for a TV/Streaming Series
| "Norman Rockwell"
| 
| style="text-align:center;" | 
|-
| July 22, 2021
| Best Animation/Family Poster for a TV/Streaming Series
| "Chalkboard"
| 
| style="text-align:center;" | 
|-
! scope="row" style="text-align:center;" | People's Choice Awards
| December 6, 2022
| The Comedy Show of 2022
| Young Sheldon
| 
| style="text-align:center;" | 
|-
! scope="row" rowspan="6" style="text-align:center;" | Nickelodeon Kids' Choice Awards
| May 2, 2020
| Favorite Family TV Show
| Young Sheldon| 
| style="text-align:center;" | 
|-
| rowspan="2" | March 13, 2021
| Favorite Family TV Show
| Young Sheldon| 
| rowspan="2" style="text-align:center;" | 
|-
| Favorite Male TV Star
| Iain Armitage
| 
|-
| rowspan="2" | April 9, 2022
| Favorite Family TV Show
| Young Sheldon| 
| rowspan="2" style="text-align:center;" | 
|-
| Favorite Male TV Star (Family)
| Iain Armitage
| 
|-
| March 4, 2023
| Favorite Family TV Show
| Young Sheldon| 
| style="text-align:center;" | 
|-
! scope="row" style="text-align:center;" | Teen Choice Awards
| August 12, 2018
| Choice Breakout TV Star
| Iain Armitage
| 
| style="text-align:center;" | 
|-
|}

See alsoThe Wonder Years''

Notes

References

External links
 
 

2017 American television series debuts
2010s American high school television series
2010s American single-camera sitcoms
2020s American college television series
2020s American high school television series
2020s American single-camera sitcoms
American prequel television series
American television spin-offs
CBS original programming
Coming-of-age television shows
Cultural depictions of physicists
English-language television shows
Nerd culture
Television series about children
Television series about Christianity
Television series about dysfunctional families
Television series about geniuses
Television series about siblings
Television series about twins
Television series by Warner Bros. Television Studios
Television series created by Chuck Lorre
Television series set in 1989
Television series set in 1990
Television series set in 1991
Television series set in 1992
Television shows featuring audio description
Television shows set in Texas
The Big Bang Theory
Television productions suspended due to the COVID-19 pandemic